Bob Connolly is an Australian film director, cinematographer and author. He is best known for his documentaries produced over the past 30 years, including The Highlands Trilogy and Rats in the Ranks. More recent films include Facing the Music (2001) and Mrs Carey's Concert (2011). His films have won an Academy Award nomination, AFI Awards, and Grand Prix at the Cinéma du Réel Festival.

Biography
Connolly was educated at Sydney's Saint Ignatius' College, Riverview and attended Sydney University. He trained as a journalist at the Australian Broadcasting Corporation (ABC), where he worked for almost a decade as a foreign correspondent, current affairs reporter and documentary filmmaker. While at the ABC he made over 30 documentaries and met his future wife Robin Anderson, then a research assistant. The couple had two daughters together.

In 1980 he left the ABC to work independently with Robin Anderson. Their first film together was River Journey (1980), Shot on 35mm film during an arduous 2 week rafting trip down Tasmania's Franklin River, the film played a major role in the river's subsequent preservation. For the next twelve years Connolly and Anderson directed their focus on the Highlands of Papua New Guinea. The couple developed an acclaimed professional partnership which included the award-winning Highlands trilogy of documentaries about Papua New Guinea, which saw First Contact receive an Academy Award Nomination.

In 1986 following training in 16mm cinematography and sound recording at the Australian Film, Television and Radio School (AFTRS), they returned to the Highlands to make Joe Leahy's Neighbours (1989) followed by Black Harvest (1992). The three PNG films are still widely distributed around the world as The Highlands Trilogy and have together won more than 30 national and international awards.

In 1996, Rats in the Ranks followed treachery in the inner workings of Sydney inner city Leichhardt Council.

Connolly and Anderson were awarded the Byron Kennedy Award by the Australian Film Institute in 1992. In 2001, they were awarded the Brisbane Film Festival's Chauvel Award.

2001 saw the release of Facing the Music, Connolly and Anderson's last film. The film won the 2001 AFI Award for Best Documentary and was voted most popular film at the Sydney and Brisbane Film Festivals.

Anderson died in 2002, and Connolly initially intended to end his film making career, however 2011 saw the release of Mrs Carey's Concert. After opening in 70 cinemas in Australia the film became one of the most successful Australian theatrical documentaries of all time. It also won the 2011 AACTA Award for Best Feature Length Documentary and Best Direction in a Documentary.

Books
Connolly's 2005 book Making Black Harvest won the Walkley Book Award for Best Non Fiction. Previous books by Connolly were The Fight for the Franklin (1982) and First Contact, which he co-wrote with Anderson (1987)

Filmography
Major works by Bob Connolly include:

 Franklin River Journey - 1980
 First Contact - 1983
 Joe Leahy's Neighbours - 1988
 Black Harvest - 1992
 Rats in the Ranks - 1996
 Facing the Music - 2001 
 Mrs Carey's Concert - 2011

See also

 Cinema of Australia

References

External links
 

Australian film directors
Living people
Year of birth missing (living people)
People educated at Saint Ignatius' College, Riverview